The Blue and Gray Museum, sometimes called the North Alabama Civil War Museum in Decatur, Alabama is believed to be America's largest privately owned collection of American Civil War artifacts. The museum is also home to a number of non-Civil War artifacts including Union General Joseph Mansfield's ivory-handled Colt 1851 Navy revolver, shako military hats that date to the Mexican–American War, Lt. Charles E. Warren's 1810–1840-era sword, and letters from Ulysses S. Grant, John C. Calhoun, Ormsby Mitchel, and P.G.T. Beauregard.

See also
 Blue and Gray Museum (disambiguation)

References

External links
 official site

American Civil War museums in Alabama
Buildings and structures in Decatur, Alabama
Museums in Morgan County, Alabama